The Victorian Ornithological Research Group (VORG) is a small project-focused ornithological group of amateurs and professionals based in Victoria, Australia.  It was formed in 1962.  It publishes a bulletin, VORG Notes.  The objectives of the group are to:
 promote and encourage the study of all aspects of bird life by any means, including:
 field studies
 participation in the Australian Bird and Bat Banding Scheme
 cooperation with the National Parks and Wildlife Division of the Department of Conservation and Natural Resources or its equivalent for the time being
 encourage and assist in the publication of the results of such work
 provide a meeting place for discussion groups, the reading of papers and social activities
 make provision for the retention of field records, diaries and other relevant documents
 cooperate with persons or organisations having interests similar to those of VORG
 coordinate the activities of groups engaged in work consistent with the above objects

Current projects include
 Movements of particular bird species in the suburban Melbourne, Mornington and Bellarine Peninsula Regions
 Albert Park Survey
 Penguin Study
 Short-tailed Shearwater Banding
 Flame Robin Banding
 Little Raven & Forest Raven Study
 Lorikeets of the Melbourne Region Study

External links
 VORG

Ornithological organisations in Australia
1962 establishments in Australia